Jovan Džiknić (born 26 April 1989) is a Serbian football forward who plays for Sremac.

Džiknić made over 50 caps playing for Čukarički in the Serbian SuperLiga and Serbian First League. Later he was with Dorćol and Hajduk Beograd. As the best scorer of Sopot in the first half-season with 9 goals in 2015–16 Serbian League Belgrade, Džiknić moved in Bežanija in the winter break off-season. After a half-season without caps for Bežanija, Džiknić returned to Sopot in summer 2016.

References

External links
 
 

1989 births
Living people
Footballers from Belgrade
Association football forwards
Serbian footballers
FK Čukarički players
FK Dorćol players
FK Sopot players
FK Hajduk Beograd players
FK Bežanija players
Serbian First League players
Serbian SuperLiga players